At least four ships of the Brazilian Navy have borne the name Amazonas

 , a  launched in 1908 and stricken in 1931
 , an  launched in 1943 and stricken in 1973
 , a  acquired in 1973 and scrapped in 2001
 , an  launched in 2009 as Port of Spain for the Trinidad and Tobago Coastguard she was acquired by Brazil in 2012

Brazilian Navy ship names